"Come Live with Me' is a 1973 single written by Felice and Boudleaux Bryant and recorded by Roy Clark.  "Come Live with Me" was Roy Clark's twelfth hit on the country chart and his only number one.  The single stayed at number one for a single week and spent a total of sixteen weeks on the country chart, also crossing over to the top 40 of the easy listening chart and reaching the lower reaches of the Hot 100, peaking at 89 on that chart.

Chart performance

References

Roy Clark songs
1973 singles
Songs written by Felice and Boudleaux Bryant
Dot Records singles
Song recordings produced by Joe Allison
1973 songs